Avelina is a female first name.

History
The name was borrowed into the Russian language as "" (Avelina). Its diminutives include Avelinka, Lina, and Ava.

In Latin languages, the name may have been latinized from Proto-Germanic languages. It may be a diminutive of the name Avila.

Notable people 

 Avelina Landín (1919-1991), Mexican singer
 Avelina Mouzo Leis (1904-2017), Spanish supercentenarian
 Avelina de Fortibus, latinized name of the British Aveline de Forz, Countess of Aumale (1259-1274)

See also
Aveline, a last name
Evelyn (name)
Eileen, a given name

References

Notes

Sources
Н. А. Петровский (N. A. Petrovsky). "Словарь русских личных имён" (Dictionary of Russian First Names). ООО Издательство "АСТ". Москва, 2005. 

